The European Second Language Association (EuroSLA) is a learned society for researchers with an interest in second language and second language acquisition.

History
EuroSLA was established in Colchester, the United Kingdom, in 1989 and the first president of the society was Vivian Cook. The 2018 president is Danijela Trenkić (University of York).

Publications
The Journal of the European Second Language Association is published after the annual conferences. The EUROSLA Yearbook has been published annually by the John Benjamins Publishing Company since 2000.

Grants and awards

Distinguished scholar award
The association presents a yearly "best article prize" and a career award "for outstanding scholarship and contribution to the field". Previous winners of the latter award have been:
2014 - Vivian Cook
2015 - David Singleton
2016 - Carmen Muñoz
2017 - Michael Sharwood Smith
2018 - Jan Hulstijn

See also
European Association for the Teaching of Academic Writing

References

External links

Second-language acquisition